Euchromius saltalis is a moth in the family Crambidae. It was described by Hahn William Capps in 1966. It is found in Argentina.

References

Crambinae
Moths described in 1966
Moths of South America